The Portugal men's national under-18 and under-19 basketball team is a national basketball team of Portugal, administered by the Federação Portuguesa de Basquetebol. It represents the country in international men's under-18 and under-19 basketball competitions.

Portugal hosted the 1999 FIBA Under-19 World Championship, where they finished 16th.

FIBA U18 European Championship participations

See also
Portugal men's national basketball team
Portugal men's national under-16 basketball team
Portugal women's national under-18 basketball team

References

External links
Official website 
Archived records of Portugal team participations

Basketball in Portugal
Basketball
Men's national under-18 basketball teams
Men's national under-19 basketball teams